is a Japanese boxer. He competed in the men's light welterweight event at the 1964 Summer Olympics.

References

1944 births
Living people
Japanese male boxers
Olympic boxers of Japan
Boxers at the 1964 Summer Olympics
Place of birth missing (living people)
Light-welterweight boxers